Micrurus psyches, the Northern coral snake, or the Carib coral snake, is a species of coral snake in the family Elapidae. Specimens have been identified in Guyana, French Guiana, Suriname, Venezuela, Brazil, Trinidad, and Colombia.

References 

psyches
Snakes of South America
Snakes of North America
Reptiles of Brazil
Reptiles of Guyana
Reptiles of Colombia
Reptiles of French Guiana
Reptiles of Suriname
Reptiles of Venezuela
Reptiles of Trinidad and Tobago
Reptiles described in 1803